Arremon is a genus of neotropical birds in the family Passerellidae.  With the exception of the green-striped brushfinch  which is endemic to Mexico, all species are found in South America, with a few reaching Central America.

These sparrows are found in lowland woodlands and forests where they usually forage on the ground. They have olive or grey upperparts with a black head. Many have a white line above the eye and some have a black band across the breast.

Taxonomy
The genus Arremon was erected in 1816 by the French ornithologist Louis Jean Pierre Vieillot in his Analyse d'une Nouvelle Ornithologie Élémentaire to accommodate the pectoral sparrow (Arremon taciturnus). The name is from the Ancient Greek arrhēmōn meaning "silent" or "without speech".  The pectoral sparrow had been given the French name "L'Oiseau Silencieux" by the polymath Georges-Louis Leclerc, Comte de Buffon in 1779.

The genus contains 20 species.

This genus includes species traditionally placed in Buarremon and Lysurus.

References

External links
 
 

 
Bird genera
Taxa named by Louis Jean Pierre Vieillot
Taxonomy articles created by Polbot